Brookridge is a census-designated place (CDP) in Hernando County, Florida, United States. The population was 4,420 at the 2010 census, up from 3,279 at the 2000 census.

Geography
Brookridge is located in central Hernando County at  (28.548698, -82.490423). It is bordered to the east by Florida State Road 589 (the Suncoast Parkway), to the south across Florida State Road 50 by Spring Hill, and to the west by High Point. SR 589 leads south  to Tampa and north  to its terminus at U.S. Route 98 near Sugarmill Woods. SR 50 leads east  to Brooksville, the Hernando County seat, and west  to U.S. Route 19 at Weeki Wachee.

Demographics

As of the census of 2000, there were 3,279 people, 1,823 households, and 1,168 families residing in the CDP. The racial makeup of the CDP was 98.87% White, 0.15% African American, 0.09% Native American, 0.18% Asian, 0.21% from other races, and 0.49% from two or more races. Hispanic or Latino of any race were 0.95% of the population.

There were 1,823 households, out of which 2.5% had children under the age of 18 living with them, 59.0% were married couples living together, 4.0% had a female householder with no husband present, and 35.9% were non-families. 33.5% of all households were made up of individuals, and 29.0% had someone living alone who was 65 years of age or older.  The average household size was 1.76 and the average family size was 2.14.

In the CDP, the population was spread out, with 2.9% under the age of 18, 1.3% from 18 to 24, 5.4% from 25 to 44, 19.0% from 45 to 64, and 71.4% who were 65 years of age or older.  The median age was 72 years. For every 100 females, there were 82.0 males.  For every 100 females age 18 and over, there were 81.4 males.

The median income for a household in the CDP was $24,774, and the median income for a family was $30,139. The per capita income for the CDP was $18,122.  About 4.2% of families and 5.7% of the population were below the poverty line, including none of those under age 18 and 5.7% of those age 65 or over.

References

Census-designated places in Hernando County, Florida
Census-designated places in Florida